Tom Clark may refer to:

Sportspeople
Tom Clark (Surrey cricketer) (1924–1981), English cricketer
Tom Clark (Sussex cricketer) (born 2001), English cricketer
Tom Clark (footballer), soccer player of the 1940s
Tom Clark (American football), American college football coach

Others
Tom C. Clark (1899–1977), U.S. Supreme Court justice
Tom Clark (industrialist) (1916–2005), New Zealand industrialist and yachting supporter
Tom Clark (journalist) (born 1952/53), Canadian journalist
Tom Clark (poet) (1941–2018), American poet

See also
 Tommy Clark, a character in Heroes Reborn
 Tom Clarke (disambiguation)
 Thomas Clark (disambiguation)